Manouba University is a public university in Manouba, Tunisia.

Organization 
 National School of Computer Sciences
 Higher Institute of Multimedia Arts of Manouba
 Press and Information Sciences Institute
 Business School of Tunis

National School of Computer Sciences

The National School of Computer Sciences or ENSI, is an engineering school founded in 1984.

References

External links
Official website
 National School of Computer Sciences

 
Universities in Tunisia